Echinolittorina ziczac, previously known as Littorina ziczac, common name the "zebra periwinkle", is a species of small sea snail, a marine gastropod mollusc in the family Littorinidae.

This species lives in the tropical Western Atlantic Ocean, from Florida to Barbados, including the Caribbean coast of Central America. It is very common on intertidal rocks.

Description 
The maximum recorded shell length is 23 mm.

Habitat 
Minimum recorded depth is -3 m. Maximum recorded depth is 0 m.

References

Littorinidae
Gastropods described in 1791
Taxa named by Johann Friedrich Gmelin